John George Yuill (2 October 1885 – 9 July 1916) was an English amateur footballer who played in the Football League for Manchester City and Stockport County as an outside right.

Early life and playing career 
Yuill attended Manchester Grammar School. During the early part of his football career, he worked for the printing firm Henry Blacklock & Co. Ltd in Manchester. As a footballer, Yuill played for Northern Nomads, Sale Holmfield, Manchester City, Oldham Athletic, Stockport County, Wrexham, Chester and Port Vale. He scored one goal in four Central League appearances for Port Vale during the 1911–12 season.

World War I
In September 1914, one month into the First World War, Yuill enlisted as a private in the 19th (Service) Battalion of the Manchester Regiment. He was sent overseas with his battalion in November 1915 and went into the trenches near Berles-au-Bois the following month. By June 1916, Yuill had been promoted to corporal and was operating as part of a Lewis gun section. He took part in the successful attacks of the 30th Division on the first day on the Somme and was promoted to lance sergeant after the Capture of Montauban. Yuill was killed during the Capture of Trônes Wood on 9 July 1916 and is commemorated on the Thiepval Memorial.

Career statistics

References

1885 births
1916 deaths
Footballers from Hendon
English footballers
Association football outside forwards
Northern Nomads F.C. players
Manchester City F.C. players
Oldham Athletic A.F.C. players
Stockport County F.C. players
Wigan Town A.F.C. players
Wrexham A.F.C. players
Military personnel from Middlesex
Chester City F.C. players
Port Vale F.C. players
English Football League players
British Army personnel of World War I
Manchester Regiment soldiers
British military personnel killed in the Battle of the Somme
People educated at Manchester Grammar School